Tre Torri is a station on Line 5 of the Milan Metro which opened on November 14, 2015.

History 
The works for the construction of the station began in July 2011, as part of the second section of the line, from Garibaldi FS to San Siro Stadio. It was opened to the public on 14 November 2015, the last station of Line 5 to be opened.

Station structure 
Tre Torri is an underground station with two tracks served by an island platform and like all the other stations on Line 5, is wheelchair-accessible.

It is situated within the CityLife district, surrounded by the three towers (Hadid Tower or "The Twisted"; Libeskind Tower or "The Bent"; and the Isozaki Tower or "The Straight").

References

Line 5 (Milan Metro) stations
Railway stations opened in 2015
2015 establishments in Italy
Railway stations in Italy opened in the 21st century